David Johnson (born August 26, 1987) is a former American football tight end and fullback. He was drafted by the Pittsburgh Steelers in the seventh round (241st overall) of the 2009 NFL Draft. He played college football for Arkansas State, where he was twice awarded All-Sun Belt Conference honors. Johnson was also a member of the San Diego Chargers.

Professional career

Pittsburgh Steelers
At the end of the 2010 season, Johnson and the Steelers appeared in Super Bowl XLV. He was the starting fullback in the 31–25 loss to the Green Bay Packers.

On October 9, 2011, Johnson scored his first career touchdown when he caught a one-yard pass from quarterback Ben Roethlisberger against the Tennessee Titans.

On April 11, 2012, the Steelers signed Johnson to a one-year, $1.26 million contract. During a preseason game against the Philadelphia Eagles on August 10, 2012, Johnson suffered a torn ACL which eliminated him for the 2012 season. He was waived/injured on August 13, 2012, and subsequently reverted to injured reserve on August 16. On March 12, 2013, the Steelers signed Johnson again to a one-year deal.

San Diego Chargers
Johnson signed with the San Diego Chargers on March 12, 2014.

Pittsburgh Steelers (second stint)
On May 17, 2016, the Steelers signed Johnson to a one-year deal. In his first season back with Pittsburgh, he played in all 16 regular season games, catching 7 passes for 80 yards. He also caught a 2-point conversion pass from Ben Roethlisberger in Week 10 against the Cleveland Browns. Johnson played in all three of the Steelers' postseason contests, making his only postseason reception for 1 yard against the New England Patriots in the AFC Championship game.

On March 9, 2017, Johnson re-signed with the Steelers. He was released on September 2, 2017.

NFL career statistics

Source:

References

External links
San Diego Chargers bio
Arkansas State Red Wolves football bio
Rotoworld player page

1987 births
Living people
American football fullbacks
American football tight ends
Arkansas State Red Wolves football players
Players of American football from Arkansas
Pittsburgh Steelers players
San Diego Chargers players
Sportspeople from Pine Bluff, Arkansas